Deryk Shockley (born August 6, 1976) is a former American soccer player who played for the Richmond Kickers in the A-League.

Career statistics

Club

Notes

References

1976 births
Living people
Spartanburg Methodist College alumni
American soccer players
United States men's youth international soccer players
Association football midfielders
Baltimore Bays (1993–1998) players
Richmond Kickers players
Wilmington Hammerheads FC players